Alive and Cooking was an Australian television cooking show hosted by celebrity chef James Reeson. The program was produced by WIN Television, airing five days a week on the WIN Network.

History 
In 2007, WIN Television announced a new cooking show to replace Fresh with the Australian Women's Weekly, a similar show provided by the Nine Network. At the time, WIN were in the middle of intense negotiations with Nine, which resulted in the removal of some Nine-produced programs from the schedule.

Alive and Cooking aired its first episode on Monday 2 June 2008 at 11.30am on most of WIN's regional stations.

It remained in that time slot for the duration of the entire first season. In 2009, the Nine Network axed Fresh with the Australian Women's Weekly and replaced it with Alive and Cooking. In late 2009, the Nine Network expanded Nine Morning News to one hour as part of an expansion of Nine News content across their daytime schedule which resulted in Alive and Cooking being dropped from the Nine daytime schedule. WIN, Nine Adelaide and Nine Perth (both owned by WIN), and NBN Television moved the show to 3pm weekdays. In July 2010, WIN & NBN moved the show back to its original 11:30am weekday timeslot in place of Nine Morning News. Nine restarted showing the program again from 24 September 2010 with the launch of their new digital sub-channel 9Gem.

Availability 
Alive and Cooking is broadcast across Australia on GEM. The program has not aired on WIN since 30 June 2016 due to becoming a Channel Ten show. The show returned later that year, airing at 2:30pm as it was previously.

From 31 July 2017, the 8th season will be broadcast at 3.30pm weekdays on Network Ten, with 70 episodes to be screened until early November.

Merchandise
Some "Food For All Seasons" DVDs have been released, plus a number of cooking books featuring recipes from the show.

James Reeson 

James Reeson is a British celebrity chef who is famous in Australia. He is renowned for his television cooking shows James Can Cook and The Occasional Cook. He was also a chef in various hotels and on cruise ships around Europe and the Mediterranean. He first travelled to Australia to indulge his love of longboard surfing in Victoria, then began a catering enterprise.  When a friend undertaking media studies needed a subject for a course project, James agreed and this led to him coming to the attention of a producer then at the ABC.  After several series each of shorts and episodes on that network, James was commissioned by WIN to host Alive and Cooking.

See also 
 Huey's Cooking Adventures
 WIN Television

References 

WIN Television original programming
Australian cooking television series
2008 Australian television series debuts
2016 Australian television series endings
2017 Australian television series debuts
2017 Australian television series endings
English-language television shows
2000s cooking television series
2010s cooking television series